Katie Leung  (born 8 August 1987) is a Scottish actress. Initially famous for playing Cho Chang, the titular character's first love interest in the Harry Potter film series, she is also best known for her roles as Caitlyn in the animated series Arcane and Ash in the sci-fi series The Peripheral.

Among British television audiences, Leung is known for her lead roles in the miniseries dramas One Child and Strangers, and for her recurring role as Blair Ferguson in the police dramedy series Annika. In 2012, she made her stage debut in the play Wild Swans, and has since appeared in several other stage productions.

Leung has an interest in the arts, having studied painting and design at the University of the Arts London, and she holds degrees in photography from Edinburgh College of Art and theatre from the Royal Conservatoire of Scotland.

Early life
Leung was born on 8 August 1987 in Dundee, to Peter Leung, a Hong Kong-born businessman and restaurateur who opened a company in Glasgow, and Kar Wai Li, a banker. Her parents divorced when she was three, and she continued living in Scotland with her father, stepmother, and siblings after her mother moved back to Hong Kong. Her father's occupation led to Leung growing up in multiple cities, including Ayr, Hamilton, and Motherwell. She attended secondary school at Hamilton College.

Career

2005–2011: Harry Potter and other early roles
Leung's father saw an advertisement for a Harry Potter and the Goblet of Fire casting call, and suggested she should try out. She waited four hours in line for a five-minute audition, despite feeling she had little likelihood of obtaining the role. Two weeks later, she was called back for a workshop and was cast as Cho Chang, beating over 3,000 other girls for the part. She has stated that her Scottish accent probably gave her an advantage in the casting, as the casting director asked the girls who attended the audition, "Is there anyone here from Scotland?", to which only Leung raised her hand.

In a 2011 interview, Leung recalled how her fondest memory of the Harry Potter experience was the first audition, because both her parents, who were separated at the time, went with her: "It was a really nice moment because my parents hadn't seen each other for a long, long time." In an effort to heavily promote Goblet of Fire, Warner Bros. sent Leung to China in the film's second week of release, in an atypical move towards a market that was not used to frequent celebrity visits at the time.

Leung reprised her role in the subsequent films in the series, most notably Harry Potter and the Order of the Phoenix, in which her character had the distinction of being Harry Potter's first romance. As a result, Leung and co-star Daniel Radcliffe (Harry) shared an on-screen kiss that received much media coverage. While Leung was greeted warmly by most of the fandom, other fans created hate websites in response to her casting and posted many racist messages which were upsetting to her at the time. In March 2021, Leung opened up further about the racist harassment she received from fans while filming Harry Potter; appearing on an episode of the Chinese Chippy Girl podcast, she revealed that she was told by her publicists to deny what was happening if any interviewer asked.

Leung was named Scotland's most stylish female and the hottest Scotswoman in 2007 by The Scotsman. She has also been featured in Teen Vogue and the Evening Standard. In July 2007, she was cast by Gold Label Records, a subsidiary of EMI in Hong Kong, to be the female lead in the music video Love Coming Home by Leo Ku. Leung filmed the video in London while promoting Order of the Phoenix. Ku described Leung's acting as "professional" and "mature".

In her first role outside of Harry Potter, Leung played Hsui Tai in the episode "Cat Among the Pigeons" of ITV1's Agatha Christie's Poirot, which premiered on 21 September 2008.

2011–present: Continued stage and screen roles
Following the end of Harry Potter, Leung was uncertain if she wanted to further pursue a career in acting but was inspired to continue after attending a drama course at the Royal Conservatoire of Scotland. In December 2011, she was awarded the role of Jung Chang as her stage debut role in Chang's autobiographical play Wild Swans. In comparing film to live performances, Leung said, "The obvious challenge is of course getting it right the first time, which is weirdly exciting for me." The play made its world premiere in Cambridge, Massachusetts in February 2012, before returning to Motherwell and concluding with an April-May run at the Young Vic in London.

In June 2012, it was confirmed that Leung would star in the Channel 4 four-part drama series Run as leading character Ying, an undocumented Chinese immigrant living in Brixton. In 2013, Leung starred alongside Vera Chok in The World of Extreme Happiness, a play about the world of migrant workers in China's rapidly emerging modern era. In the production, staged at The Shed at the National Theatre, she played the role of Sunny, a female migrant worker.

In April 2014, it was announced that Leung was to play the lead role of Mei, a first-born Chinese girl adopted by an American mother and British father, in the TV miniseries One Child. In the story, her character is asked to return to her birthplace, Guangzhou, when her birth mother desperately seeks her assistance in saving her son. The series, a co-production of BBC Drama and Sundance TV, filmed in May 2014 in London and Hong Kong, aired on Sundance TV in December 2014, and was broadcast on BBC Two in February 2016. Leung received praise from Catherine Gee of The Daily Telegraph, who called her performance "beautifully understated".

In late 2016, Leung appeared in the Tony Kushner play The Intelligent Homosexual's Guide to Capitalism and Socialism with a Key to the Scriptures (iHo) at the Hampstead Theatre in London. In 2017, she co-starred with Jackie Chan and Pierce Brosnan in The Foreigner, playing Fan, Chan's character's daughter. This was followed by a supporting role as Lau Chen in the ITV drama Strangers, also known by the title White Dragon.

Leung has subsequently appeared in recurring roles as DC Blair Ferguson in the Alibi series  Annika, the voice of Caitlyn in the Netflix series Arcane, and Ash in the Amazon Prime Video series The Peripheral.

In 2023, she starred in the first season of Paramount+'s series adaptation of Simon Beckett's novel The Chemistry of Death.

Personal life

Leung delayed plans to go to art college and university to film Harry Potter and the Order of the Phoenix. During this period, Leung had said she was undecided about pursuing an acting career after Harry Potter and wished to attend university to study art and design.

In 2007, Leung helped The Prince's Trust charity raise £100,000 by launching a children's art competition, donating one of her own paintings that was auctioned for £960.

Leung has also expressed a passion for photography. In 2009, she donated a photo to Sightsavers International's I:Click 2009 competition, with benefits going to treat and prevent blindness for residents of impoverished countries. While appearing in Wild Swans, Leung worked to complete her photography degree at Edinburgh College of Art.

Afterwards, Leung attended the Royal Conservatoire of Scotland in Glasgow, where she completed the BA in Acting course. For her final-year performance at the Conservatoire in 2014, Leung appeared as Béline in a production of Molière's The Hypochondriac.

On 19 August 2018, Leung participated in the wedding of another former Harry Potter cast member, Afshan Azad.

In January 2022, Leung's essay "Getting into Character" was published in the book East Side Voices: Essays Celebrating East & Southeast Asian Identity in Britain. In her essay, Leung wrote about how her ethnicity impacted her experiences growing up and her acting career.

On 1 January 2023, for New Year's Day, Leung revealed on Instagram that her son Wolf had been born the previous Halloween.

Leung speaks fluent Cantonese and basic Mandarin.

Filmography

Film

Television

Theatre credits

Awards

References

External links

 
 Katie Leung at Curtis Brown
 Leung's photography blog on Tumblr

1987 births
Living people
21st-century Scottish actresses
Alumni of the Edinburgh College of Art
Alumni of the Royal Conservatoire of Scotland
British actresses of Chinese descent
People educated at Hamilton College, South Lanarkshire
Scottish film actresses
Scottish people of Chinese descent
Scottish people of Hong Kong descent
Scottish stage actresses
Scottish television actresses